Strings is a 1991 Canadian paint-on-glass animation short film by Wendy Tilby, produced by the National Film Board of Canada.

Summary
The 10 min. 23 sec. animated short simultaneously follows a woman preparing for a bath and her downstairs neighbour rehearsing with his string quartet, exploring the connections between these two neighbours. The film garnered numerous awards, including the Genie Award for Best Animated Short and a nomination for the Academy Award for Best Animated Short Film. It was also included in the Animation Show of Shows.

In other media
Tilby also appeared in an NFB short film, Wendy Tilby with Strings, talking about the creative process behind the film.

References

External links
Watch Strings at NFB.ca
Excerpt on Vimeo
Strings on YouTube

1991 films
Paint-on-glass animated films
Canadian animated short films
Films shot in Montreal
Films directed by Wendy Tilby
National Film Board of Canada animated short films
Best Animated Short Film Genie and Canadian Screen Award winners
1990s animated short films
1991 animated films
Animated films without speech
1990s Canadian films